The  is Japanese aerial lift line in Sōbetsu, Hokkaidō, operated by . Opened in 1965, the line climbs Mount Usu, the active volcano in Shikotsu-Tōya National Park. The observatory has a view of Lake Tōya, Shōwa Shinzan, and the central crater of Mount Usu.

Basic data
System: Aerial tramway, 2 track cables and 2 haulage ropes
Cable length: 
Vertical interval: 
Passenger capacity per a cabin: 106
Cabins: 2
Stations: 2
Duration of one-way trip: 6 minutes

Gallery

See also
List of aerial lifts in Japan

External links

 Official website

Aerial tramways in Japan
1965 establishments in Japan